SFIC  may refer to:
  French Section of the Communist International, see French Communist Party
 Shanghai Fortune Industrial Company, former name of Shanghai Fosun Pharmaceutical (Group) Co., Ltd.